This is a list of significant events that occurred in the year 1718 in science.

Astronomy
 Edmond Halley discovers the proper motion of stars.

Chemistry
 Étienne François Geoffroy presents the first ever table of chemical affinity (based on displacement reactions) to the French Academy of Sciences.

Mathematics
 Abraham de Moivre publishes The Doctrine of Chances: a method of calculating the probabilities of events in play in English, which goes through several editions.

Medicine
 The Charitable Infirmary, Dublin, is founded by six surgeons in Ireland, the first public voluntary hospital in the British Isles.

Technology
 May 15 – James Puckle patents the Puckle Gun, in England.

Births
 May 16 – Maria Gaetana Agnesi, Italian mathematician (died 1799)
 May 23 – William Hunter, Scottish anatomist (died 1783)
 August 17 – Francis Willis, English physician specialising in mental disorders (died 1807)
 Salomée Halpir (née Rusiecki), Lithuanian physician (died after 1763)

Deaths
 March 11 – Guy-Crescent Fagon, French physician and botanist (born 1638)
 April – James Petiver, English naturalist and apothecary (born c. 1665)
 December 9 – Vincenzo Coronelli, Italian cartographer and encyclopedist (born 1650)
 December 11 – Pierre Dionis, French surgeon and anatomist (born 1643)

References

 
18th century in science
1710s in science